Jurij Rodionov and Emil Ruusuvuori were the defending champions but chose not to defend their title.

Nikola Čačić and Yang Tsung-hua won the title after defeating André Göransson and Marc-Andrea Hüsler 6–4, 6–4 in the final.

Seeds

Draw

References

External links
 Main draw

Shymkent Challenger II - Doubles
2019 II Doubles